Masikia is a genus of dwarf spiders that was first described by Alfred Frank Millidge in 1984.

Species
 it contains four species, found in Canada, Russia, and the United States:
Masikia bizini Nekhaeva, Marusik & Buckle, 2019 – Russia (north-east Siberia)
Masikia caliginosa Millidge, 1984 – Russia (Europe to Far North-East, Kurile Is.), USA (Alaska)
Masikia indistincta (Kulczyński, 1908) (type) – Russia (Europe to Far North-East), Canada
Masikia relicta (Chamberlin, 1949) – USA

See also
 List of Linyphiidae species (I–P)

References

Araneomorphae genera
Linyphiidae
Spiders of North America
Spiders of Russia